The Earldom of Castlemaine  was a title created in the Peerage of Ireland.  It was created for Roger Palmer, the husband of Barbara Palmer (née Villiers), mistress to King Charles II.  The Earl was also given the title Baron Limerick. The earldom was named after Castle Maine in County Kerry.

The title was limited to his male heirs by Barbara (i.e. as opposed, that is, to any later wife he might have) making it clear that the earldom was for his wife's services to the King and not his own.  As the only child officially fathered by the 1st Earl (which probably was not actually his) was female, the title became extinct on his death.

Earls of Castlemaine, First Creation (1661)
Roger Palmer, 1st Earl of Castlemaine (1634–1705)

Notes

Extinct earldoms in the Peerage of Ireland
Peerages created with special remainders
Noble titles created in 1661
County Kerry